Let the banners flutter (German: Weit lasst die Fahnen wehen) is a German song written by composer Gustav Schulten (30 January 1897 - 1945) in 1917, and published nationally in Germany in the year 1941.

The song refers to the Landsknecht movement. A Landsknecht is the name given to a mostly German mercenary of the late 15th and 16th centuries who fought on foot and whose primary weapon was the pike, following the Swiss model of the Reisläufer.

Lyrics

References 

German songs